Per Mikael Christian Nilsson (born 16 June 1967) is a Swedish former footballer. He made 52 Allsvenskan appearances for Djurgårdens IF.

References

Swedish footballers
Djurgårdens IF Fotboll players
1967 births
Living people
Association footballers not categorized by position
Tyresö FF (men) players